Antonia Brough (May 18, 1897 – November 4, 1937) British actress born in Chelsea, London, England; Died in Kensington, England.

Selected filmography
 The Farmer's Wife (1928)
 Under the Greenwood Tree (1929)
 Spanish Eyes (1930)
 Song of Soho (1930)
 Maria Marten, or The Murder in the Red Barn (1935)
 Dandy Dick (1935)
 The Tudor Touch (1937)

References

External links
 

Date of birth unknown
1937 deaths
British film actresses
20th-century British actresses
1897 births